Lieutenant-Colonel Terence Edmund Gascoigne Nugent, 1st Baron Nugent,  (11 August 1895 – 27 April 1973), known as Sir Terence Nugent between 1945 and 1960, was a British soldier and courtier.

Background, education and military career
Nugent was the younger son of Brigadier General George Colborne Nugent, eldest son of Sir Edmund Charles Nugent, 3rd Baronet, of Waddesdon (see Nugent Baronets), who was killed in action in 1915. His mother was Isabel Mary Bulwer, daughter of General Sir Edward Gascoigne Bulwer. Sir Guy Nugent, 4th Baronet, was his elder brother. He was educated at Eton and the Royal Military College, Sandhurst. He fought in the First World War as a major in the Irish Guards, was mentioned in despatches, wounded and awarded the Military Cross. He was promoted to lieutenant-colonel in 1936.

Career as courtier
Nugent was appointed Equerry to the Duke of York (the future George VI) in 1927, a post he held until 1936. He subsequently served as Comptroller of the Lord Chamberlain's Office between 1936 and 1960 and as an Extra Equerry to George VI between 1937 and 1952 and to Elizabeth II between 1952 and 1960. He was made a Member of the Royal Victorian Order (MVO) in 1927, promoted to Commander (CVO) in 1937, to Knight Commander (KCVO) in 1945 and to Knight Grand Cross (GCVO) in 1952. In 1960 he was elevated to the peerage as Baron Nugent, of West Harling in the County of Norfolk. He was also made a Grand Officer of the Legion of Honour the same year. From 1960 to 1973 he was a Permanent Lord-in-waiting to Elizabeth II.

Personal life
Lord Nugent married Rosalie Heathcote-Drummond-Willoughby, daughter of Brigadier-General the Honourable Charles Strathavon Heathcote-Drummond-Willoughby, in 1935. They had no children. He died in April 1973, aged 77, when the barony became extinct. Lady Nugent died in July 1994.

References

External links

1895 births
1973 deaths
People educated at Eton College
Graduates of the Royal Military College, Sandhurst
Recipients of the Military Cross
Knights Grand Cross of the Royal Victorian Order
Grand Crosses with Star and Sash of the Order of Merit of the Federal Republic of Germany
English cricketers
Norfolk cricketers
Presidents of the Marylebone Cricket Club
People from Harling, Norfolk
Hereditary barons created by Elizabeth II
Barons Nugent
British Army personnel of World War I